Lincoln Barrett (born 18 September 1979), better known by the stage name High Contrast, is a Welsh electronic music producer, DJ and record producer. He produces drum and bass music, and his 2009 album Confidential reached BPI gold certification (100,000 units sold in the UK).

Career

Early work
Barrett was born in Penarth, near Cardiff, and grew up more interested in films and film soundtracks than rock or pop music; he cites Walter Carlos's A Clockwork Orange soundtrack album and the Vangelis soundtrack for Blade Runner as defining musical influences. Whilst studying film making in Newport, he heard J Majik's Arabian Nights which turned the then 17-year-old Barrett on to drum and bass music. Barrett used to work in Cardiff's only electronic record shop, Catapult. A short time after he began to make music, he was given a DJ residency at Cardiff's drum and bass night, named Silent Running. During his residency at Silent Running, Barrett played alongside artists such as Grooverider and London Elektricity.

2000s
In June 2002, Barrett's debut album, True Colours, was released on Hospital Records, with "Return of Forever" and "Global Love" finding their way into the UK Singles Chart. His second album was High Society.

On 6 April 2003, High Contrast was featured on the BBC Radio 1 Essential Mix show. His mix included liquid funk mostly from the Hospital Records label. On 9 January 2005, this Essential Mix was replayed on Radio 1 when another drum and bass artist, Andy C, was unable to deliver his mix. In October 2005, Barrett launched his own record label, The Contrast. The first single, "Days Go By" / "What We Do" was released in early November 2005.

In 2007, he delivered his second effort, selected as "Essential Mix of the Year" by Pete Tong. His third album Tough Guys Don't Dance was released in October 2007. The second single from the album, "If We Ever", was supported on Radio 1 by Annie Mac, Zane Lowe and Jo Whiley helping it to reach number 1 in the DnB chart, number 1 in the dance chart and number 4 in the Indie chart.

In 2008, High Contrast remixed the #1 single "No Way to Say" for Japanese pop singer Ayumi Hamasaki's remix album, Ayu-mi-x 6: Silver. He also made successful remixes of "Hometown Glory" by Adele and "Pjanoo" by Eric Prydz, which were later included on the album, Confidential. He played them during his take over for the Rob Da Bank show on BBC Radio 1 in January 2009.

2010s
He played at the 2011 Coachella Valley Music and Arts Festival. Barrett currently is a resident DJ at the following clubs: Aperture at Clwb Ifor Bach (The Welsh Club) in Cardiff; and at Roxy in Prague. He was also on regular rotation at Fabric in London.

High Contrast played a key role in selecting and producing the music for the Athletes Parade at the 2012 Summer Olympics opening ceremony. Half a dozen tracks by High Contrast were played and are present in the event's official soundtrack, Isles of Wonder.

In July 2014, High Contrast's new single with Clare Maguire "Who's Loving You" was announced. A double release, 'Part 2' was Special Delivery on Annie Mac's BBC Radio 1 show, followed by 'Part 1' as "Hottest Record in the World" for Zane Lowe.

In 2015, he remixed the R&B track "Muhammad Ali" by the group Faithless. The same year, the mix was included in the group's '2.0' remix album release, and also incorporated into the second half of their live performances of the song.

He signed with 3Beat in April 2016 and released his first single on the label, "Remind Me".

In 2017, a new song, titled "Shotgun Mouthwash", was featured on the T2 Trainspotting soundtrack.

High Contrast's remix of "The One" by Jorja Smith was Nominated for a Grammy at the 62nd Annual Grammy Awards

2020s 
He released his latest album, titled Notes From The Underground, on 13 November 2020.

Personal life
His father, Paul "Legs" Barrett, used to manage Shakin' Stevens. His mother, Lorraine Barrett, was the Welsh Assembly member for Cardiff South and Penarth until May 2011.

Discography

Albums 
 True Colours (2002)
 High Society (2004)
 Tough Guys Don't Dance (2007)
 Confidential (2009) (UK #68), BPI: Gold
 The Agony and The Ecstasy (2012) (UK #45)
 The Road Goes On Forever (EP) (2012)
 Questions (EP) (2017)
 Night Gallery (2017)
 Notes from the Underground (2020)

Compilation albums 
 FabricLive.25 (2005)
 Watch the Ride - High Contrast (2008)
 Hospitality Presents This is Drum + Bass (2009)
 Isles of Wonder (2012)

Singles

Remixes 

 "Pictures in My Head" by M.J. Cole
 "Edge of Seventeen" by Stevie Nicks
 "Kaleidoscope" by Tiesto
 "Wall" by Enter Shikari
 "Baggy Bottom Boys" by Jokers of the Scene
 "Ready for the Weekend" by Calvin Harris
 "In for the Kill (Skream's Let's Get Ravey Mix)" by La Roux
 "Most Precious Love" by Blaze featuring Barbara Tucker
 "Hometown Glory" by Adele
 "Pjanoo" by Eric Prydz
 "Reload It" by Kano
 "Time to Pretend" by MGMT
 "Something Good '08" by Utah Saints
 "Papua New Guinea" by Future Sound of London
 "I Found U" by Axwell
 "It's Too Late" by The Streets
 "Talk" by Coldplay
 "Gold Digger" by Kanye West
 "Flashing Lights" by Kanye West
 "We Run This" by Missy Elliott
 "My Dreams" by London Elektricity featuring Robert Owens
 "Remember the Future" by London Elektricity
 "Headlock" by Imogen Heap
 "Barcelona" by D.Kay & Epsilon
 "Hey U" by Basement Jaxx
 "Thugged Out Bitch" by Dillinja
 "Girls & Boys (Aquasky song)" by Aquasky and El Horner
 "Renegade Snares" by Omni Trio
 "Back for More" by Influx Datum
 "Karma (Comes Back Around)" by Adam F & Guru
 "No More" by Roni Size featuring Beverley Knight and Dynamite MC
 "No Soul" by ILS
 "Spaced Invader" by Hatiras
 "This Feeling" by Blue Sonix
 "Born Free" by M.I.A.
 "Blue Orchid" by The White Stripes
 "Show Me Love" by Robin S.
 "Run" by Joel Compass
 "California Love" by 2Pac featuring Dr. Dre
 "Let Go for Tonight" by Foxes
 "Love On a 45" by MJ Cole
 "The One" by Jorja Smith
 "So Many People" by Two Door Cinema Club
 "Ultraviolet" by Freya Ridings
 "Leave a Light On" by Tom Walker
 "Sometimes the Going Gets a Little Tough" by Finn
 "Savage" by MIST
 "The Difference" by Flume
 "Freedom" by Sub Focus & Wilkinson featuring Empara Mi (Remix vs. Sub Focus & Wilkinson)
 "Mine Right Now" by Sigrid
 "Better Off Without You" by Becky Hill featuring Shift K3Y
 "24/7" by NOISY
 "Lord It's a Feeling" by London Grammar
 "Paradise" by James Vincent McMorrow
 "Foreign Things" by Amber Mark

References

External links 
 High Contrast official biography at Hospital Records.com
 High Contrast blog
 
 

1979 births
Living people
People from Penarth
British drum and bass musicians
Hospital Records artists
Welsh record producers
Welsh DJs
Electronic dance music DJs